George Ainslie may refer to:

 George Ainslie (general) (died 1804), Scottish general
 George Robert Ainslie (1776–1839), Scottish general and coin collector
 George Ainslie (delegate) (1838–1913), Congressional delegate from Idaho
 George Ainslie (psychologist) (born 1944) American psychiatrist, psychologist and behavioral economist
 George Ainslie (Virginia politician) (1868–1931), mayor of Richmond, Virginia, 1912–1924